Friends in Love may refer to:

"Friends in Love", a song by Johnny Mathis and Dionne Warwick
 Friends in Love (Johnny Mathis album), 1982
 Friends in Love (Dionne Warwick album), 1982